Joe O'Connor is an American actor best known for playing Marshall Darling, father of the title character in the television series Clarissa Explains It All.

Career 
O'Connor's first television role was in the TV series Emergency! in 1979, playing a sailor in the episode "The Convention". He gained fame when he joined the cast of the television series Clarissa Explains It All (1991–1994), in which he played Marshall Darling, father of the title character.

After this, he only appeared in several episodes of other television series, and to several TV and feature films. In 1996, he appeared in the episode ""A Girl and Her Cat" of Sabrina, the Teenage Witch, which reunited him with Melissa Joan Hart, who played the main character in both Sabrina and Clarissa. He later appeared on other TV series including Friends (in 1997), Malcolm in the Middle (2003), Melrose Place (three episodes in 2008), Without a Trace (2008), Private (four episodes in 2009), Mad Men (in six episodes, between 2007 and 2013) and The Young and the Restless (in four episodes, in 2011).

Films in which he has appeared include A Bedtime Story (1997), The Chaos Factor (2000) and Exposed (2003). Television films in which he has appeared include Taking Back Our Town  and When Billie Beat Bobby.

Filmography

References

External links 
 Retrieved with Joe O'Connor (actor) in Youtube
 

Living people
American male television actors
Year of birth missing (living people)
American male film actors
20th-century American male actors
21st-century American male actors